Polaromonas jejuensis is a Gram-negative, aerobic, non-spore-forming, rod-shaped, nonmotile bacterium from the genus Polaromonas, which was isolated from soil from Halla Mountain on Jeju Island in Korea. Its colonies are pale yellow.

References

External links
Type strain of Polaromonas jejuensis at BacDive -  the Bacterial Diversity Metadatabase

Comamonadaceae
Bacteria described in 2008